Oxytauchira is a genus of grasshoppers (Acrididae) in the subfamily Oxyinae.  The known (probably incomplete) distribution of species is: India, southern China, Indochina, Java and Sulawesi.

Species
The Orthoptera Species File lists:
 Oxytauchira amaculata Mao, Ren & Ou, 2011
 Oxytauchira aspinosa Ingrisch, 1989
 Oxytauchira aurora (Brunner von Wattenwyl, 1893)
 Oxytauchira bilobata Ingrisch, 1989
 Oxytauchira brachyptera Zheng, 1981
 Oxytauchira elegans Willemse, 1965
 Oxytauchira flange Mao, Ren & Ou, 2011
 Oxytauchira gracilis (Willemse, 1931) - type species (as Tauchira gracilis Willemse, C)
 Oxytauchira gressitti (Tinkham, 1940)
 Oxytauchira hui (Li, Lu, Jiang & Meng, 1995)
 Oxytauchira jaintia Ingrisch, Willemse & Shishodia, 2004
 Oxytauchira oxyelegans Otte, 1995
 Oxytauchira paraurora Mao, Ren & Ou, 2011
 Oxytauchira puerensis (Li, Xu & Zheng, 2014)
 Oxytauchira pui (Liang & Zheng, 1986)
 Oxytauchira rohilla Mobin & Usmani, 2019
 Oxytauchira ruficornis (Huang, 1985)
 Oxytauchira truncata Kumar & Chandra, 2018
 Oxytauchira yaoshanensis (Li, 1987)
 Oxytauchira yunnana (Zheng, 1981)

References

External links
 Images at Phuket Nature Tours (grasshoppers) of: Oxytauchira brachyptera by Doi Ang Khang and Oxytauchira bilobata at Khao Yai National Park
 

 Acrididae genera
 Orthoptera of Asia